Aechmea bromeliifolia var. albobracteata is a plant in the genus Aechmea. This species is native to Brazil.

Cultivars
 Aechmea 'Brillig'

References

BSI Cultivar Registry Retrieved 11 October 2009

bromeliifolia var. albobracteata
Flora of Brazil